The Union Jack Club is an Armed Forces Club in central London, England, for enlisted members and veterans of the British Armed Services and their families. Located near London Waterloo railway station, the club has over 260 rooms for accommodation (singles, twins, doubles, fully accessible, family, suite and flats), restaurant, bar, small library, and a full range of meeting and banqueting rooms.

The club's main entrance is in Sandell Street off Waterloo Road, opposite Waterloo station. Many guest bedrooms on the upper floors have views over London.

History
The idea for the club came from Ethel McCaul, a Royal Red Cross nurse who served in field hospitals during the South African War at the start of the 20th century. She noted that while officers enjoyed membership of various gentlemen's clubs in London, no equivalent existed for enlisted personnel and they therefore used public houses and inns of varying repute.

The initial sum of £60,000 was raised at various galas and functions. Any donor giving £100 could name a room. Sir Arthur Conan Doyle took the opportunity to endow the "Lady Conan Doyle Room" with his contribution. Members of the royal family attended a benefit concert at the Royal Albert Hall.

George V, while the Prince of Wales, laid the club's foundation stone in July 1904. It was officially opened three years later, in July 1907, by King Edward VII and Queen Alexandra. The address of the original Edwardian building was 91 Waterloo Road, London.

Ethel McCaul was adamant that her brave servicemen and their families should have somewhere to stay at no more of a cost than one day’s pay. Waterloo seemed the obvious place as this was the principal railhead leading to the ports and garrisons which served the Empire. The Union Jack Club was to be built as a National Memorial to those who had fallen in the South African War. The Union Jack Club naturally found itself in great demand during both World Wars and its resources were fully stretched, with the Union Jack Club growing from 208 bedrooms in 1904 to a total of 800 beds in 1939. For many years after the First World War an annual donation was sent anonymously to the Union Jack Club and with each payment came a note with the words “In gratitude for a scrap of comfort”. The words of this anonymous donor are today commemorated by a marble plaque sited in the Reception Area.

During the Second World War, the area around Waterloo Station was bombed severely and the Union Jack Club itself suffered considerable damage which required extensive repair. Added to this, there was an urgent need to modernise its amenities, décor and the way it conducted its business. In 1970, it was therefore decided to construct a completely new building, with ‘Investors in Industry’ (now 3i) building three tower blocks and, themselves leasing one block for a period of 125 years whilst the two tower blocks would constitute the new Union Jack Club. Demolition work began in 1971 and the Union Jack Club opened for business on its new premises on 16 October 1975.

In 2004, Queen Elizabeth II and her husband Prince Philip, Duke of Edinburgh visited the club to help celebrate its centenary.

There are a number of points of historical interest throughout the Union Jack Club, such as the Victoria Cross and George Cross boards, which are the only known commemoration of their kind to all those who have earned the Victoria Cross and George Cross.

Since its opening in 1907, the Union Jack Club has seen over 21 million people stay at the Club and it continues to remain active.

References

External links
 Union Jack Club website
 The Queen and The Duke of Edinburgh help celebrate the centenary of the Union Jack Club, 3 December 2004
 London SE1 — Queen visits Union Jack Club, 3 December 2004

1904 establishments in the United Kingdom
Organizations established in 1904
Military of the United Kingdom
Buildings and structures in the London Borough of Lambeth
Skyscrapers in the London Borough of Lambeth
Clubs and societies in London
Military clubs and societies
Residential skyscrapers in London